John Tyndale (died 1413), of Deene, Northamptonshire, was an English politician.

He was a Member (MP) of the Parliament of England for Northamptonshire in January 1380, October 1382, February 1383, April 1384, November 1384,
1386, 1393 and 1407, and for Cambridgeshire in September 1397.

References

14th-century births
1413 deaths
English MPs January 1380
English MPs October 1382
People from North Northamptonshire
English MPs February 1383
English MPs April 1384
English MPs November 1384
English MPs 1386
English MPs 1393
English MPs 1407
English MPs September 1397